The South Yorkshire Police and Crime Commissioner is the police and crime commissioner of the South Yorkshire Police in South Yorkshire. The post was created on 22 November 2012, following an election held on 15 November 2012, and replaced the South Yorkshire Police Authority. The current South Yorkshire Police and Crime Commissioner is Alan Billings of the Labour Party, who was elected in 2014 and again in 2016. The role was created in 2012 and the initial office holder was Shaun Wright, who resigned on 16 September 2014. The police and crime commissioner is required to produce a strategic South Yorkshire Police and Crime Plan, setting out the priorities for the South Yorkshire Police, and their work is scrutinised by the South Yorkshire Police and Crime Panel.

List of office holders

Elections
The South Yorkshire Police and Crime Commissioner is elected by the supplementary vote system where there are three or more candidates, or the first past the post system if there are only two. The first election took place in November 2012 (delayed from May 2012) and the next regular election was scheduled for May 2016. Elections take place every four years. The electorate are resident in the four metropolitan boroughs of Barnsley, Doncaster, Rotherham and Sheffield that make up South Yorkshire.

2012

The first election was held in 2012. The candidates were:
 David Allen was the English Democrats candidate.
 Jonathan Arnott, General Secretary of the UK Independence Party, was the UKIP candidate
 Nigel Bonson was the Conservative candidate.
 Robert Teal was the Liberal Democrat candidate.
 Shaun Wright, Vice-Chair of the South Yorkshire Police Authority, was the Labour candidate, having defeated Meredydd Hughes, former Chief Constable of South Yorkshire Police in the nomination process.

2014

Following the resignation of Shaun Wright on 16 September 2014, a by-election must be held within 35 working days by virtue of Section 51 of the Police Reform and Social Responsibility Act 2011. The election was held on 30 October 2014. Turnout was 14.88%.

2016

This election was held on 5 May 2016.

2021

Powers and functions
The powers and functions of the South Yorkshire Police and Crime Commissioner are derived from the Police Reform and Social Responsibility Act 2011, replacing those of the South Yorkshire Police Authority. The main functions are:

Appoint the chief constable of South Yorkshire Police
Publish, and periodically refresh, a five-year police and crime plan that sets out policing priorities
Set the annual budget and precept (tax) level
Publish an annual report and accounts.

The work of the South Yorkshire Police and Crime Commissioner is scrutinised by the South Yorkshire Police and Crime Panel, made up of elected councillors from the four local authorities in South Yorkshire.

Police and crime plan
The South Yorkshire Police and Crime Plan 2013/17 was published in 2013 and was refreshed in 2014.

Salary
The annual salary of the South Yorkshire Police and Crime Commissioner is £86,700.

References

External links

Police and crime commissioners of South Yorkshire
Police and crime commissioners in England